Wu Guichao (born 2 January 1997) is a Chinese footballer currently playing as a midfielder for Chengdu Rongcheng.

Club career
Wu Guichao would play for the Beijing Guoan youth team before being promoted to the senior team during the 2017 Chinese Super League season. On 20 February 2018 he would transfer to second tier football club Guangdong South China Tiger. He would make his debut on 28 July 2018 in a league game against Yanbian, which ended in a 2-0 defeat. This would be followed by his first goal, which was in a league on 23 September 2018 against Shenzhen that ended in a 2-2 draw.

On 3 February 2020, Guangdong South China Tiger was dissolved and Wu was free to join second tier football club Chengdu Rongcheng. He would go on to make his debut and score his first goal for the club in a league game on 12 September 2020 against Beijing Renhe, which ended in a 3-2 victory. The following season he would establish himself as a vital member within the team and aid them to promotion to the top tier at the end of the 2021 league campaign.

Career statistics
.

References

External links

1997 births
Living people
Chinese footballers
Association football midfielders
China League One players
Beijing Guoan F.C. players
Guangdong South China Tiger F.C. players
Chengdu Rongcheng F.C. players